The gastrocolic ligament is a portion of the greater omentum that stretches from the greater curvature of the stomach to the transverse colon. It forms part of the anterior wall of the lesser sac.

Dividing the gastrocolic ligament provides access to the anterior pancreas and the posterior wall of the stomach. This is commonly done for Whipple procedures, distal pancreatectomy, some forms of the Roux-en-Y gastric bypass, and exploratory laparotomy.

References

External links
  - "Abdominal Cavity: The Greater Omentum"
 Description at umich.edu

Abdomen